The 1907 Connecticut Aggies football team represented the Connecticut Agricultural College, now the University of Connecticut, in the 1907 college football season.  The Aggies were led by second year head coach George H. Lamson, and completed the season with a record of 2–5.

Schedule

References

Connecticut
UConn Huskies football seasons
Connecticut Aggies football